A medal is an object typically given as an award.

Medal may also refer to:
 Macmillan English Dictionary for Advanced Learners (MEDAL)
 Medal (band), English alternative rock band 
 Medal (film), a 2022 Gujarati-language film
 Medals, currency surrogates used to play medal games

See also
 Medallion (architecture)
 Meddle (disambiguation)
 Metal
 Mettle (disambiguation)